Rubén "Pocho" Ademar Acosta (born March 22, 1968) is a Uruguayan former soccer player. He played for clubs in Uruguay and Chile.

References
 
 Profile at Tenfield Digital 

1968 births
Living people
Footballers from Montevideo
Association football forwards
Uruguayan footballers
Club Nacional de Football players
Villa Española players
C.A. Cerro players
C.D. Antofagasta footballers
Club Deportivo Palestino footballers
Huracán Buceo players
Racing Club de Montevideo players
Tacuarembó F.C. players
Chilean Primera División players
Uruguayan expatriate footballers
Expatriate footballers in Chile